The 1995 Hawaii Rainbow Warriors football team represented the University of Hawaiʻi at Mānoa in the Western Athletic Conference during the 1995 NCAA Division I-A football season. In their ninth season under head coach Bob Wagner, the Rainbow Warriors compiled a 4–8 record.

Schedule

References

Hawaii
Hawaii Rainbow Warriors football seasons
Hawaii Rainbow Warriors football